Cohen Milstein is an American plaintiffs' law firm that engages in large-scale class action litigation. The firm filed a number of lawsuits against Donald Trump during and after his presidency, including a lawsuit which successfully blocked the Trump administration's attempt to roll back the Deferred Action for Childhood Arrivals (DACA) program. Cohen Milstein has made the implementation of corporate diversity, equity, and inclusion (DEI) programs a key part of its litigation strategy. The firm has been hired by various state attorneys general to assist in complex litigation, including by suing ExxonMobil over climate change. Anita Hill was of counsel at Cohen Milstein.

Civil rights litigation

The firm is active in civil rights litigation and describes itself as having attorneys who "are nationally recognized thought-leaders in diversity, equity, and inclusion." Its pro bono clients have included the American Civil Liberties Union (ACLU), the National Association for the Advancement of Colored People (NAACP), and the Brady Center to Prevent Gun Violence.

Cohen Milstein represented plaintiffs who sued the Trump administration over the rescission of the Deferred Action for Childhood Arrivals (DACA) program. A federal judge argued that the Trump administration must fully restore DACA, saying the law's rescission was "arbitrary and capricious" and "inadequately explained." The case, Department of Homeland Security v. Regents of the University of California, went before the U.S. Supreme Court, which reversed the Trump administration's order in a win for undocumented immigrants who had entered the U.S. as minors.

In 2020, Cohen Milstein joined the ACLU, the Lawyers' Committee for Civil Rights Under Law, and the Poverty & Race Research Action Council in suing the United States Department of Housing and Urban Development (HUD) over its rollback of portions of the Fair Housing Act. In the lawsuit, Cohen Milstein alleged that HUD had gutted "the long-established legal framework for 'disparate impact' claims, which have helped dismantle systemic barriers to fair housing for decades."

Lawsuits against Donald Trump

The firm assisted District of Columbia Attorney General Karl Racine and Attorney General of Maryland Brian Frosh in filing a lawsuit accusing President Donald Trump of using his hotel in Washington D.C. to unconstitutionally profit from his political office. D.C. and Maryland v. Trump alleged that Trump had violated the Foreign Emoluments Clause. In January 2021, the Supreme Court of the United States issued a summary disposition ordering the Fourth Circuit to dismiss the case as moot.

In February 2021, on behalf of Democratic U.S. Representative Bennie Thompson, Cohen Milstein and the NAACP filed a lawsuit against former President Trump and Rudy Giuliani over their role in the 2021 United States Capitol attack. The lawsuit alleged that Trump and Giuliani had collaborated and conspired with the white supremacist groups Proud Boys and Oath Keepers to prevent the U.S. Congress from certifying the results of the 2020 presidential election. A number of congressional Democrats signed onto the lawsuit.

Push for corporate diversity, equity, and inclusion programs

Cohen Milstein has made the implementation of corporate diversity, equity, and inclusion (DEI) programs a key part of its litigation strategy. As a result of litigation spearheaded by Cohen Milstein, L Brands and Victoria's Secret agreed to workplace reforms including investing $45 million each into DEI initiatives. The $90 million settlement was earmarked to establish DEI councils, hire a DEI consultant, and to publish annual reports to stockholders discussing DEI objectives. Alphabet Inc., the parent company of Google, agreed to spend $310 million on DEI initiatives as part of a settlement over a series of sexual harassment and misconduct lawsuits. Alphabet Inc. will be required to start a DEI advisory council.

In a lawsuit against Pinterest board members, Cohen Milstein asked a judge for approval of twice the firm's usual lodestar billing because Pinterest agreed to corporate governance reforms, which Cohen Milstein said would make the firm more diverse and inclusive and therefore enhance its value. A U.S. District Judge denied the firm's $5.4 million fee request and ordered Cohen Milstein "to enforce the settlement terms and police the corporation", assessing "how much progress has actually been made (or not made)." More fees may be paid in the future if the firm is able to convince the judge "how much benefit really flows from the settlement."

Lawsuits on behalf of state attorneys general

Cohen Milstein has a practice area in which it helps state attorneys general with complex litigation. In 2014, The New York Times wrote that Cohen Milstein was part of "a flourishing industry that pairs plaintiffs' lawyers with state attorneys general to sue companies, a collaboration that has set off a furious competition between trial lawyers and corporate lobbyists to influence these officials." The firm has been a major donor to state attorneys general associations, candidates, state party committees, and attorneys general running for governor.

In 2016, the Attorney General of the U.S. Virgin Islands, Claude Walker, authorized the firm to investigate whether ExxonMobil had committed fraud by denying climate change. Cohen Milstein stood to earn as much as 27% percent of any monetary damages generated by the litigation, plus some costs. That arrangement was criticized by Exxon, who said it gave the law firm an inappropriate profit motive and that Walker had ceded too much authority to outside lawyers by authorizing them to act as prosecutors. Exxon sued Cohen Milstein, arguing the firm wasn't disinterested in the case because it stood to earn a contingency fee. Exxon's suit alleged constitutional violations regarding free speech, due process, and unreasonable searches and seizures.

References

Privately held companies of the United States
Law firms based in Washington, D.C.